R. K. Singh Patel is a member of the 17th Vidhan Sabha of Uttar Pradesh. He represents the Manikpur constituency of Uttar Pradesh and is a member of the Bhartiya Janta Party (BJP). Before this he was also the member of 15th Lok Sabha of India.He represented the Chitrakoot-Banda constituency of India and was a member of the Samajwadi Party (SP).His son Sunil patel also a BJP  leader

Education and background
Patel holds B.A. degree from University of Allahabad, Uttar Pradesh. He was an agriculturist by profession before joining politics.

Posts held

See also

List of members of the 15th Lok Sabha of India

References 

Living people
1959 births
Samajwadi Party politicians
Lok Sabha members from Uttar Pradesh
India MPs 2009–2014
State cabinet ministers of Uttar Pradesh
People from Chitrakoot district
People from Banda district, India
Uttar Pradesh MLAs 1997–2002
Uttar Pradesh MLAs 2002–2007
Uttar Pradesh MLAs 2017–2022
India MPs 2019–present